The 132nd Fighter Escadrille of the Polish Air Force (Polish: 132. Eskadra Myśliwska) was one of the fighter units of the Polish Army in 1939. It was attached to the Army Poznań.

History

The unit was formed in 1928 by renaming an earlier fighter unit.

Crew and equipment

On 1 September 1939 the escadrille had 10 PZL P.11c airplanes. 

The air crew consisted of: 
commanding officer kpt. pil. Franciszek Jastrzębski
his deputy ppor. pil. Henryk Bibrowicz

Pilots:

 ppor. Józef Czachowski (reserve)
 ppor. Mikołaj Kostecki
 ppor. Jerzy Łazowski (reserve)
 ppor. Paweł Łuczyński
 pchor. Bohdan Anders
 pchor. Witold Jaroszka
 pchor. Jan Maliński
 pchor. Kazimierz Olewiński
 pchor. Jan Pudelewicz
 pchor. Stefan Wapniarek
 kpr. Włodzimierz Chojnacki
 kpr. Wawrzyniec Jasiński
 kpr. Władysław Kuik
 kpr. Kazimierz Mazur
 kpr. Bronisław Raszewski
 kpr. Leon Skarbecki

See also
Polish Air Force order of battle in 1939

References
 

Polish Air Force escadrilles